American Bell refers to two entities that were associated with the Bell System.

Bell Telephone Company, at one time known as American Bell Telephone Company, original parent of American Telephone and Telegraph Company
AT&T Information Systems, founded in 1982 as American Bell, Inc., an unregulated subsidiary of American Telephone and Telegraph Company that sold telephone equipment